Sir Thomas Skewes-Cox (1849 – 15 October 1912) was a British  Conservative Party politician.

He was born in Worth, Sussex to a farmer and his wife born in Llansantffraid-ym-Mechain. Having pre-marriage lived with parents at Townshend Villas, Richmond the entry of the public probate calendars and Who's Who records he lived at The Manor House, Petersham where he died.  He simultaneously, when on London business, lived at 8 Lancaster Place, Strand.  He married Jessie Warne in 1882 and had three sons, one daughter.  He was a solicitor from 1881; chairman of the Isleworth Brewery; was a Magistrate, Alderman, and Mayor of Richmond, and Alderman of Surrey County Council; Chairman of Richmond Horticultural Society; Director of Richmond Royal Horse Show Society; and Conservator of River Thames.

He was Member of Parliament (MP) for the Kingston-upon-Thames which covered Kingston, its main suburbs and Richmond, Kew, Sheen and Mortlake from 1895 to 1906. Hansard lists 44 contributions spread across all years in the period 1895 to 1905.

In 1902, Skewes-Cox opened a new wing at the Kingston Institute.

He enrolled in the Carlton and Badminton clubs. Her executor was retired Major Thomas E. Skewes-Cox (1884-1971).

Notes

External links 
 

Conservative Party (UK) MPs for English constituencies
UK MPs 1895–1900
UK MPs 1900–1906
Politics of the Royal Borough of Kingston upon Thames
Mayors of places in Greater London
Members of Surrey County Council
1849 births
1912 deaths
People from Worth, West Sussex